Fraternité , is a French comedy TV film from 1954, directed by René Lucot, written by Fernand Fleuret, starring Julien Carette and Louis de Funès.

Cast 
 Julien Carette 
 Louis de Funès 
 Hubert Deschamps

References

External links 
 

1954 films
French comedy films
1950s French-language films
French black-and-white films
1950s French films